The Deputy High Commissioner of India to the United Kingdom is the deputy head of the High Commission of India to the United Kingdom. The Deputy High Commission is located at India House in London, United Kingdom. Typically, Deputy High Commissioner is the number-two diplomat assigned to the Indian embassy to the United Kingdom and considered as the second-in-command to the High Commissioner of India to the United Kingdom. The current Deputy High Commissioner is Sujit Ghosh.

Deputy High Commissioners of India to the United Kingdom
List of former Deputy High Commissioners

See Also
List of High Commissioners of India to the United Kingdom

References

India and the Commonwealth of Nations
United Kingdom and the Commonwealth of Nations
United Kingdom
India